Year 108 (CVIII) was a leap year starting on Saturday (link will display the full calendar) of the Julian calendar. In Rome at the time, it was known as the Year of the Consulship of Trebonius and Bradua (or, less frequently, year 861 Ab urbe condita). The denomination 108 for this year has been used since the early medieval period, when the Anno Domini calendar era became the prevalent method in Europe for naming years.

Events

By place

Roman Empire 
 Appius Annius Trebonius Gallus and Marcus Appius Bradua become Roman Consuls.

By topic

Arts and sciences 
 Tacitus writes Histories, which covers the period from AD 69 to AD 96.
 The Hypogeum of Yarhai, an underground tomb from the Syrian city of Palmyra dedicated to the family of Yarhai, is built.

Births

Deaths 
 Hyacinth of Caesarea, Christian martyr

References